NirmaLabs is a high-tech incubator located at Nirma University campus in Ahmedabad, India.

A not-for-profit Section 25 company, NirmaLabs was set up by Nirma Education and Research Foundation (NERF).

The Department of Science and Technology, Government of India, lists NirmaLabs as a Technology Business Incubator.

NirmaLabs' Spin off Companies:
 RapidRadio Solutions Pvt. Ltd.
 Acton Bio-tech
 Orizin Technologies Pvt. Ltd.
 Axio Biosolutions Pvt. Ltd.
 Anaxee Tech Pvt. Ltd

See also
 Business plan
 Entrepreneurship
 List of business incubators
 Science park
 Startup
 Venture capital

References

External links 
Department of Science and Technology, Govt. of India
RapidRadio Solutions Pvt.Ltd.

Institutes of Nirma University of Science & Technology
Radio-frequency identification
Business incubators of India